Dubost is a French surname. Notable people with the surname include:

Antonin Dubost (1842–1921), French journalist and politician
Charles Dubost (lawyer) (1905-1991), French lawyer
Charles Dubost (surgeon) (1914-1991), French surgeon
Coralie Dubost (born 1983), French politician  
Paulette Dubost (1910–2011), French actress

French-language surnames